The Henry Ward Beecher Monument, a statue of Henry Ward Beecher created by the sculptor John Quincy Adams Ward, was unveiled on June 24, 1891, in Borough Hall Park, Brooklyn and was later relocated to Cadman Plaza, Brooklyn in 1959.

Background
Henry Ward Beecher was a 19th-century liberal theologian, preacher, and orator. To create the monument, Ward worked from the death mask in addition to photographs.

The figures of the children below the base of the monument symbolize the role Beecher played in the abolitionist movement and his devotion to children. According to the Metropolitan Museum of Art catalog by Lewis I. Sharp, the statue was widely acclaimed as one of the finest public monuments in the country. There was criticism from Beecher's family and friends regarding the accuracy of the subject's likeness.

Description
The monument features a bronze figural group by John Quincy Adams Ward and Barre granite base designed by architect Richard Morris Hunt. The statues depict Beecher, in subordinate positions are a Black female figure, to the left of the base, and, rightward, two Caucasian children (a boy and girl). The monument was cast on May 10, 1890, and dedicated on June 24, 1891. It was conserved via the Adopt-a-Monument Program in 1987.

See also

 1890 in art

References 

1890 sculptures
1891 establishments in New York (state)
Bronze sculptures in Brooklyn
Granite sculptures in New York City
Monuments and memorials in Brooklyn
Outdoor sculptures in Brooklyn
Sculptures by John Quincy Adams Ward
Sculptures of children in the United States
Sculptures of men in New York City
Sculptures of women in New York City
Statues in New York City
Downtown Brooklyn